Who Killed Who? is a 1943 Metro-Goldwyn-Mayer film noir animated short directed by Tex Avery. The cartoon is a parody of whodunit stories and employs many clichés of the genre for humor; for example, the score is performed not by the MGM orchestra but by a solo organ, imitating the style of many radio dramas of the era.

Plot
A live-action host (Robert Emmett O'Connor) opens with a disclaimer about the nature of the cartoon, namely, that the short is meant to "prove beyond the shadow of a doubt that crime does not pay".

The story begins on a dark and stormy night as the victim (voiced by Kent Rogers doing an impression of Richard Haydn), presumably the master of the very large "Gruesome Gables" mansion, is reading a book based on the cartoon in which he appears. Frightened, he muses that, according to the book, he is about to be "bumped off". Someone throws a dagger with a letter attached, telling the master that he will die at 11:30. When he objects, another letter informs him that the time has been moved to midnight.

True to form, on the final stroke of midnight a mysterious killer in a heavy black cloak and hood shoots him dead with a rather large pistol (how dead he is, though, is a matter of question), and a police detective (voiced by Billy Bletcher, modeled on characters portrayed in film by Fred Kelsey) and demanding to know "Who done it?!", immediately begins to investigate. After checking out the premises and the suspicious "red herring" servants, the officer gives a lengthy chase of the real killer.

The mansion is filled with surreal pitfalls, strange characters—including a red skeleton (a parody of Red Skelton) and a ghost that is terrified of mice—and booby traps that slow and obstruct the detective. Behind a closed door  marked "Do Not Open Until Xmas", he finds an angry Santa Claus. The detective eventually traps the killer and unmasks him, revealing him to be the opening-sequence host, who confesses "I dood it"—one of Skelton's catchphrases—before bursting out crying.

Cast

Voice cast
Billy Bletcher as Police Officer, Ghost (uncredited)
Sara Berner as Cuckoo Clock Bird, Maid (uncredited)
Kent Rogers as victim with an impression of Richard Haydn, Red Skeleton, Falling Body, and Santa Claus (uncredited)

Live-action cast
Robert Emmett O'Connor as Host (uncredited)

Availability
Tex Avery Screwball Classics: Volume 1 Blu-Ray (restored)

References

External links

1943 animated films
1943 crime films
1943 mystery films
1943 short films
1943 films
1940s parody films
1940s American animated films
1940s animated short films
1940s ghost films
Metro-Goldwyn-Mayer animated short films
Films directed by Tex Avery
American films with live action and animation
Metro-Goldwyn-Mayer films
Self-reflexive films
Films scored by Scott Bradley
Films with screenplays by Henry Wilson Allen
Films set in country houses
Murder mystery films
Santa Claus in film
Films produced by Fred Quimby
Metro-Goldwyn-Mayer cartoon studio short films
Film noir cartoons